Camilla Marie Svensson-Gustafsson (born 20 January 1969) was a female Swedish football defender. She was part of the Sweden women's national football team.

She competed at the 1996 Summer Olympics, playing 3 matches. On club level she played for Jitex BK/JG93.

See also
 Sweden at the 1996 Summer Olympics

References

External links
 
 
 http://www.soccerpunter.com/players/292449-Camilla-Svensson-Gustafsson
 FIFA.com

1969 births
Living people
Swedish women's footballers
Place of birth missing (living people)
Footballers at the 1996 Summer Olympics
Olympic footballers of Sweden
Women's association football defenders
1991 FIFA Women's World Cup players
Sweden women's international footballers